Abinadi Meza (born 1977 in Austin, Texas) is a contemporary visual artist, sound artist, conceptual artist and filmmaker whose work references spatial and temporal perception, politics, and transformation. His paintings, sound art, videos, and installations have been presented at venues across North America and Europe, including the Institute of Contemporary Arts, Dunaújváros, Hungary; FILE Festival, São Paulo, Brazil; MAXXI, Rome, Italy; Helicotrema Festival, Venice, Italy; Walker Art Center, Minneapolis; Team Titanic, Berlin; Irish Museum of Modern Art, Dublin, Ireland; Sonorities Festival, Belfast, Northern Ireland; FACT, Liverpool; La Casa Encendida, Madrid, Spain; Minneapolis Institute of Arts; and Lisbon Architecture Triennale, Portugal. Meza uses ephemeral materials such as text and sound to create transformative spaces and explore relationships regarding individuals and social context.
As a young artist Meza studied Butoh with master teachers from Japan, Europe and South America. Later he earned a Bachelor of Arts degree from the University of Northern Iowa, Cedar Falls (1999); a Master of Fine Arts degree from the University of Minnesota, Minneapolis (2004); and a Master of Architecture degree from SCI-Arc, the Southern California Institute of Architecture, Los Angeles (2009).

Meza is currently a professor of Interdisciplinary Practices and Emerging Forms in the School of Art at the University of Houston. In 2014 he was awarded a Rome Prize in Visual Art by the American Academy in Rome.

Meza has said he approaches sound as material: "it’s plastic – you can smear it, stretch it, sharpen it...I treat it like clay."

Film Exhibitions
Salt Lake City Film Festival (US)
Aesthetica Short Film Festival (UK)
Sheffield Fringe: Film At The Intersection of Art & Documentary (UK) 
Kassel Documentary Film and Video Festival (Germany) 
Simultan Festival (Romania)
Dingle International Film Festival (Ireland) 
Videomedeja Festival (Serbia) 
Atlanta Film Festival (US) 
New Filmmakers New York (US)
Cannes Art Film Festival (France)
Wellington Underground Film Festival (New Zealand)
Athens International Film + Video Festival (US) 
Noordelijk Film Festival (Netherlands)
MIA [Moving Image Art] (Chicago, Pasadena)

Sound Art Exhibitions
FILE (São Paulo)
Hipersonica (São Paulo)
Scaniaparken (Mälmo)
ANTI (Finland)
Spark Festival (Minneapolis)
Sonorities (Belfast)
Ende Tymes Festival of Noise and Experimental Liberation (Brooklyn)
Northern Spark (Minneapolis)
Helicotrema (Venice)
Radiophrenia (Glasgow)
Deep Wireless (Toronto)
Radio Kinesonus (Tokyo)
Contemporary Arts Museum Houston
MAXXI (Rome)

References

External links
Interview, Arts+Culture Texas, 2014
Sound Art project at 3rd Lisbon Architecture Triennale, 2013
 
 "Murmur" project, Finland. Commissioned by the Culture Programme of the European Commission
Abinadi Meza sound project at Irish Museum of Modern Art
article in Body, Space & Technology Journal, West London, UK
10/20/05 Radio interview with Abinadi Meza
Underwater sound installation, Malmö Sweden
'The Prisoner' animation based on Carl Dreyer's 'La Passion de Jeanne d'Arc'
Bio information, Art News
All Things Considered: National Public Radio Feature
Exhibition at Minneapolis Institute of Arts, 2008
'Sound Sweep' mobile radio project in Los Angeles. Vague Terrain Journal, Toronto, 2009
"Debating the Darkness: Talking Film with Abinadi Meza," NY Arts Magazine, print and online edition, winter 2013

Living people
American video artists
American sound artists
American conceptual artists
University of Minnesota alumni
American installation artists
Southern California Institute of Architecture alumni
American filmmakers
1977 births